The Devil and the Smalander (Swedish: Hin och smålänningen) is a 1949 Swedish drama film directed by Ivar Johansson and starring Stig Järrel, Sigge Fürst and Naima Wifstrand. It was shot at the Centrumateljéerna Studios in Stockholm. The film's sets were designed by the art director P.A. Lundgren. It is a remake of the 1927 silent film of the same title.

Cast
 Stig Järrel as Gammel-Erik aka Hin aka van Zaaten
 Sigge Fürst as 	Gunnar Rask
 Naima Wifstrand as 	Titta Grå
 Ulla Andreasson as Elna
 Arthur Fischer as 	Ola Hansson
 Wilma Malmlöf as 	Malena
 Torgny Anderberg as Per
 Sten Lindgren as Smerling
 Ruth Weijden as Amelie Smerling
 Sigbrit Molin as 	Annie Smerling
 Bengt Logardt as 	Sven Smerling
 Willy Peters as 	Casimir
 Oscar Winge as 	Vicar David
 Gull Natorp as 	Gustava

References

Bibliography 
 Qvist, Per Olov & von Bagh, Peter. Guide to the Cinema of Sweden and Finland. Greenwood Publishing Group, 2000.

External links 
 

1949 films
Swedish drama films
1949 drama films
1940s Swedish-language films
Films directed by Ivar Johansson
Swedish black-and-white films
Remakes of Swedish films
1940s Swedish films